, was an  inventor and businessman who founded Nissin Food Products Co., Ltd. He is known as the inventor of instant noodles (ramen noodles) and the creator of the brands Top Ramen and Cup Noodles.

Early life and education
Ando was born Go Pek-Hok in 1910 into a wealthy family of Hoklo Chinese ethnicity in Chiayi County, when the island of Taiwan was under Japanese colonial rule. He was raised by his grandparents within the city walls of Tainan following the deaths of his parents. His grandparents owned a small textiles store, which inspired him, at the age of 22, to start his own textiles company, using 190,000 yuan, in Tōa-tiū-tiâⁿ, Taipei.

In 1933, Ando traveled to Osaka, where he established a clothing company while studying economics at Ritsumeikan University. He renounced his Japanese citizenship after Taiwan was liberated from Japanese rule in 1945, in order to keep his property on the island, but again became a naturalized Japanese citizen in 1966.

Career

Founding Nissin

Ando was convicted of tax evasion in 1948 and served two years in jail. In his biography, Ando said he had provided scholarships for students, which at the time was a form of tax evasion. After he lost his company due to a chain-reaction bankruptcy, Ando founded what was to become Nissin in Ikeda, Osaka, Japan, starting off as a small family-run company producing salt.

Invention of Nissin Chikin Ramen

With Japan still suffering from a shortage of food in the post-war era, the Ministry of Health tried to encourage people to eat bread made from wheat flour that was supplied by the United States. Ando wondered why bread was recommended instead of noodles, which were more familiar to the Japanese. The Ministry's response was that noodle companies were too small and unstable to satisfy supply needs, so Ando decided to develop the production of noodles by himself. The experience convinced him that "Peace will come to the world when the people have enough to eat."

On August 25, 1958, at the age of 48, and after months of trial and error experimentation to perfect his flash-frying method, Ando marketed the first package of precooked instant noodles. The original chicken flavor is called Chikin Ramen. It was originally considered a luxury item with its price of ¥35 (US$0.10 in 1958 under the then exchange rate of 360 yen to the dollar  but equivalent to ¥608 by 2021 or US$5.69 under the current exchange rate of US$1 =¥106.775 in  around six times that of traditional udon and soba noodles at the time. , Chicken Ramen is still sold in Japan and now retails for around ¥120 (US$1.12), or approximately one-third the price of the cheapest bowl of noodles in a Japanese restaurant.

Cup Noodles invention

According to The Financial Times, Ando's invention of Cup Noodles in 1971, at the age of 61, helped spark the popularity of instant noodles overseas. He had observed that Americans ate noodles by breaking the noodles in half, putting them into a paper cup, and pouring hot water over the noodles. They also ate them with a fork instead of chopsticks. Ando was inspired, and felt that a Styrofoam cup—with a narrower bottom than the top—would be the ideal vessel for holding noodles and keeping them warm. Eating the noodles would then be as easy as opening the lid, adding hot water and waiting. This simplicity, efficiency and low price of Cup Noodles went on to transform Nissin's fortunes.

Ando began the sales of his most famous product, on September 18, 1971, with the idea of providing a waterproof polystyrene container. As prices dropped, instant ramen soon became a booming business. Worldwide demand reached 98 billion servings in 2009.

In 1972, the Asama-Sansō hostage standoff took place in Nagano Prefecture, Japan. Widespread coverage of the event, which included repeated images of the prefectural Riot Police Unit eating the noodles on national television, have been conjectured as boosting awareness of the brand.

Industry memberships
In 1964, seeking a way to promote the instant noodle industry, Ando founded the Instant Food Industry Association, which set guidelines for fair competition and product quality, introducing several industry standards such as the inclusion of production dates on packaging and the "fill to" line. He was also the chairman of the International Ramen Manufacturers' Association.

Personal life and death 
When Taiwan was handed over to the Republic of China after the end of World War II, Ando had to choose between becoming its citizen or remaining a Japanese subject. Ando chose the former in order to keep his ancestral properties on the island, as all Japanese nationals had to forfeit their properties in Taiwan.

Nevertheless, in 1966, Ando naturalized through marriage and became a Japanese citizen. "Momofuku" is the Japanese reading of his Taiwanese given name, while  is the surname of his Japanese wife.

Ando died of heart failure on January 5, 2007, at a hospital in Ikeda, Osaka Prefecture, at the age of 96.

Ando was survived by his wife Masako, two sons and a daughter. Ando claimed that the secret of his long life was playing golf and eating chicken ramen almost every day. He was said to have eaten instant ramen until the day he died.

Legacy

Commemoration

On April 8, 2008, Heisei 20th, a ramen summit was held in Osaka and a bronze statue of Ando was unveiled at the Momofuku Ando Instant Ramen Museum in Ikeda, Osaka Prefecture The statue depicts Ando standing atop a base resembling a noodle container while holding a noodle cup container in his right hand. Yasuhiro Nakasone (former Prime Minister of Japan) and Masako Ando (Ando's wife) attended the unveiling ceremony. 

On October 1, 2008, the company's name was changed to "NISSIN FOODS HOLDINGS". At the same time, Nissin Foods Products Co., Ltd was founded. In the same year, Project Hyakufukusi was started.

On March 5, 2015, Google placed a doodle created by Google artist Sophie Diao on its main web page commemorating Ando's birthday.

The name of the Momofuku restaurants in the United States alludes to Momofuku Ando.

Honors 
Ando was repeatedly honored with medals by the Japanese government and the emperor—including The Order of the Rising Sun, Gold and Silver Star, Second Class—in 2002, which is the second-most prestigious Japanese decoration for Japanese civilians.
 Medal of Honor with Blue Ribbon (1977)
 Order of the Sacred Treasure, Second Class, Gold and Silver Star (1982)
 Medal of Honor with Purple Ribbon (1983)
 Director-General of the Science and Technology Agency "Distinguished Service Award" (1992)
 Order of the Rising Sun, Second Class, Gold and Silver Star (2002)

Foreign decoration 
 Order of the Direkgunabhorn of Thailand, Fourth Clastas, (2001)

Order of precedence 
 Senior fourth rank (2007, posthumous)

See also

List of instant noodle brands
List of inventors

References

External links 

 
 
 
  Obituary and Appreciation in New York Times. January 9, 2007.
 Noodles Museum, Nissin Instant Ramen Noodles Museum, January 14, 2007
 Rameniac's Ode to Nissin Chikin Ramen
 A Tribute To Momofuku Ando and His Life

1910 births
2007 deaths
20th-century Chinese businesspeople
20th-century Japanese businesspeople
Businesspeople in the food industry
Japanese chief executives
20th-century Japanese inventors
Japanese noodles
Recipients of the Order of the Rising Sun, 2nd class
Ritsumeikan University alumni
Japanese people convicted of tax crimes
People from Chiayi County
Japanese people of Taiwanese descent
Hokkien businesspeople
Hokkien people
Taiwanese emigrants to Japan